Walter Henry "Wally" Naismith (31 May 1881 – 9 January 1954) was an Australian rules footballer who played for the Fitzroy Football Club and Melbourne Football Club in the Victorian Football League (VFL). He was the twin brother of Fitzroy player Charlie Naismith.

Playing mostly as a defender, Naismith was part of the strong Fitzroy side that won back to back premierships in 1904 and 1905. He left Fitzroy after the 1910 season and joined Melbourne, appearing 36 times for his new club over two seasons to bring his final VFL tally to 179 games. After retiring, Naismith was the field umpire for 11 VFL matches, from 1915 to 1919, but had more success as a boundary umpire, umpiring 207 matches from the boundary, from 1913 to 1927, including the 1919, 1920, 1922, 1925, 1926 and 1927 Grand Finals.

In 1910, Naismith married Eva Emmeline Dummett (sister of Collingwood player Alf Dummett). Two of their sons, Herb Naismith and Alby Naismith, also played VFL football.

References

External links

1881 births
Fitzroy Football Club players
Fitzroy Football Club Premiership players
Melbourne Football Club players
Australian Football League umpires
Australian rules footballers from Melbourne
1954 deaths
Australian twins
Twin sportspeople
Two-time VFL/AFL Premiership players
People from Prahran, Victoria